Correbia bricenoi is a moth of the subfamily Arctiinae. It was described by Rothschild in 1912. It is found in Ecuador.

References

Euchromiina
Moths described in 1912